Rohan Shah is an Indian actor, known for his role as Agham Neil Khanna in Itna Karo Na Mujhe Pyaar on Sony TV. He played the lead role of Vivek in the 2020 Bollywood film Hacked along with Hina Khan. He is also a part of the YouTube channel FilterCopy.

Career
Rohan made his debut with television commercial ads in the year 2001. Apart from those, he started doing various films and TV shows like Boogie Woogie, Ishaan, Humse Hai Liife, V The Serial, Gumrah: End of Innocence, and others.

Filmography

Films

Television

Web series

References

External links
 
 

Living people
Male actors from Mumbai
Indian male television actors
Male actors in Hindi cinema
Male actors in Hindi television
21st-century Indian male actors
1994 births